The PowerBook 170 was released by Apple Inc. in 1991 along with the PowerBook 100 and the PowerBook 140. Identical in form factor to the 140, it was the high end of the original
PowerBook line featuring a faster 25 MHz Motorola 68030 processor with 68882 floating point unit (FPU) and a more expensive and significantly better quality  active matrix display. It was replaced by the PowerBook 180 in 1992.

Features
Though the PowerBook 100 is the direct descendant of the Macintosh Portable based on its internal architecture, the 170 is the Portable's direct successor. A no-compromise, portable version of the desktop Macintosh, the 170 includes virtually all of the features incorporated in the original Portable, as on a comparable desktop of the day, but in a smaller and sleeker case design. Initiated as a more suitable replacement for the Portable, the only features the first generation 170 did not include in its reduced space were an external video port and internal ROM and PDS expansion slots. Indeed, Apple canceled its own external monitor adapter for the Portable shortly after it was announced, instead relying on numerous third party providers for solutions (still applicable to the 170) and FCC regulations of the day prevented any real use of the PDS expansion slot, by restricting any external connections to it. The PowerBook 180 replacement would address external video less than a year later, but expansion slots would not return to Macintosh portables  until three years later with the PowerBook 500 series, in the form of PCMCIA cards. The 170 also dropped the external floppy disk port (only the Macintosh Classic II still had one) and made no provision for a second internal floppy disk port (a feature also missing from the rest of the desktop line by this time). Overall, it had roughly the equivalent features and performance of the powerful Macintosh IIci desktop in a laptop.

The 170 was introduced with System 7.0.1, specifically to support new power management and other unique hardware features. However, due to the RAM prices in 1991, combined with its already high list price, the 170, like the 100 and 140, only had 2 megabytes (MB) RAM soldered directly onto the logicboard, which  critics felt was restrictive for use with System 7. Further, since localized versions of System 7 were not yet available worldwide, the Japanese 6.0.7 KanjiTalk version of Apple's System software was modified to support all three new PowerBooks and released as version J-6.0.7.1. As a result, this version was unofficially adapted for use with the standard 6.0.7 allowing many users to run System 6 on their PowerBooks, rather than upgrading on-board RAM with an expensive proprietary RAM card (a 6 MB card was US $899). The 170 shipped with an additional 2 MB RAM card already installed, so it was less of a problem; however 4 MB was the minimum recommended RAM size for use with System 7 and not practical for use with a RAM Disk, a battery power-saving feature.

Design
Though released at the same time as the PowerBook 140 and PowerBook 100, both the 140 and 170 were designed entirely by Apple, while the 100 was being miniaturized by Sony from the full-sized Macintosh Portable. As a result, the 170 represents the very first PowerBook created by Apple, with the 100 actually representing the first design improvements, though its internal architecture is the oldest in the series.

Specifications
Processor: Motorola 68030 CPU and Motorola 68882 FPU, both running at 25 MHz
RAM: 2 MB on board, shipped with 4 MB, can be expanded to 6 or 8 MB
ROM: 1 MB
Hard disk: 40-80 MB
Floppy disk: 1.44 MB Superdrive
Systems supported: System J-6.0.7.1, System 7.0.1-Mac OS 7.6.1
ADB: Yes (1 port)
Serial: Yes (2 ports)
Modem: optional (used for this model's expansion port)
Screen: active matrix, 1bpp 640×400

Timeline

References

External links
Macintosh PowerBook 170 technical specifications at apple.com.
Special Edition LPGA Benneton Model

170
68k Macintosh computers